The Hyundai Stellar (Hangul: 현대 스텔라) is a mid-size rear-wheel drive automobile produced by the Hyundai Motor Company to succeed the to-be-replaced Ford Cortina that Hyundai was built under license. The Stellar was launched in July 1983 and was produced until the 1992 model year. The Stellar was designed by Giorgetto Giugiaro using a chassis from the Cortina Mark V.

Technology

The engine and transmission were licensed by Mitsubishi Motors. Engines available were 1.4 L (4G33, same as the Hyundai Pony) and 1.6 L (4G32) inline-fours until 1986, using either a KM119 4- or 5-speed manual or a Borg-Warner 03-55L 3-speed automatic) and a 2.0 L engine in 1987. Trim levels included L (base), GL/CL/SL, and CXL/GSL. The CXL/GSL featured power windows, locks and mirrors, remote fuel door, remote trunk, premium sound system, full instrumentation (speed, tach, fuel, water temp, volts, and oil pressure), headlamp washers, and available air conditioning. The Stellar's Ford genes and conventional design led many British observers to compare it with the then recently discontinued Cortina - where conservative buyers were scared off by the Sierra's radical styling, a fact played upon by Hyundai's advertising agency with print advertisements depicting a jelly/jello mold shaped like the Sierra, above a picture of the Stellar. Like the Cortina, the Stellar also has wishbone suspension up front with a coil-sprung live rear axle.

As well as being comparable to the Cortina, which had been Britain's best-selling car, it also found favor with buyers due to its competitive asking price, which meant that it was priced comparably to a smaller Escort rather than a Sierra. It was sold in Britain from June 1984 until the arrival of the Lantra in 1991. It was the second Hyundai model to be imported to Europe, two years after the launch of the smaller Pony.

In 1987, the car was refreshed with the name changed to Stellar II (or Stellar 2.0 in Canada) in many markets. Changes included a 2-way catalytic converter, new instrument cluster, larger 2.0 L Mitsubishi 4G63 engine (SOHC with eight valves) with a feedback two-barrel carburetor, higher output alternator, larger headlights, and restyled taillights. The front double wishbone suspension was changed to a MacPherson strut design, along with larger brake calipers, as well as a two-piece driveshaft. The Stellar had the option of riding on several types of aluminum alloy wheels and was equipped standard with Michelin all-season tires (Canada). Also that year, an automatic transmission (Borg Warner 03-71) with overdrive was available as an option. In the domestic Korean market, this was the first of their cars to be sold as the Sonata. In Europe, the Stellar II is sometimes referred to as the Stellar Prima. This was only limited to the new 2.0 GSL model, thus differing from the continued 1.6 models. The 2.0 GSL "Prima" received new, larger bumpers, restyled lights, and an updated dashboard, while the 1.6 GSL kept the original design which was also continued for the 1.6 SL and 1.6 L. The 1.4 models were discontinued for the 1987 model year.

The Stellar was not available in the United States due to strict emission standards, but it was available in Canada and other countries. In addition, the Stellar was the only inexpensive four-cylinder powered rear-wheel drive sedan after the Toyota Corolla shifted to front-wheel drive in 1984 and the Daihatsu Charmant was discontinued in 1987. The Stellar was replaced in Canada and Europe by the Hyundai New Sonata for 1992. In the Korean domestic market, the lower end of the Stellar lineup can be considered as having been replaced by the Sonata. The Stellar (along with the Pony) would be Hyundai's last rear-wheel drive cars for North America until the 2009 Genesis.

Lineup
Prima (1983-1986)
TX (1983-1992)
FX (1983-1986)
GX (1987-1992)
GSL (1983-1986)
SL (1983-1986)
CXL (Canada only, 1984-1987)
Apex (1987)
88 (Seoul Olympic limited edition, 1988)
GXL (1989-1991)
1.8 i (1990-1992)

Europe:
 1.4 L 4-speed manual (1983-1987)
 1.4 SL 4-speed manual (1983-198?)
 1.4 GLS 5-speed manual
 1.6 L 4-speed manual (1983-1987)
 1.6 L 5-speed manual (1987-1989)
 1.6 SL 5-speed manual (1983-1989)
 1.6 SL automatic (1983-1987)
 1.6 GLS/GSL 5-speed manual (1983-1989)
 1.6 GSL automatic (1983-1989)
 2.0 GSL "Prima" 5-speed manual (1987-1989)
 2.0 GSL "Prima" automatic (1987-1989)

Major specifications
Overall length: 4416 mm (173.9 in) (2.0 GSL: 4578 mm (180.2 in))
Overall width: 1716 mm (67.6 in)
Overall height: 1372 mm (54.0 in)
Wheelbase: 2579 mm (101.5 in)
Front track: 1445 mm (56.89 in)
Rear track: 1425 mm (56.10 in)
Curb weight: 1000 kg (2204 lb.) (2.0 GSL: 1164 kg (2566 lb.))
Gross weight: 1475 kg (3251 lb.) (2.0 GSL: 1610 kg (3549 lb.))
Wheel dimensions: 13 x 4.5 in or 13 x 5.5 in
Steering type: Rack and pinion
Front brakes: Disc
Rear brakes: Drum

Modified examples
Mat Fenwick, an engineer in north Wales, replaced the original Mitsubishi engine of his 1985 Stellar with a 3.5-litre Rover V8.  The car's boot lid retains its '1.6' badge.

See also
Hyundai Elantra
Hyundai Sonata
Ford Cortina

References

Stellar
Rear-wheel-drive vehicles
Cars introduced in 1983
Mid-size cars
Sedans
Police vehicles
1980s cars
1990s cars
Cars discontinued in 1992